Bucephalus or Bucephalas (– June 326 BC) was the horse of Alexander the Great, and one of the most famous horses of classical antiquity. 

Ancient historical accounts state that Bucephalus' breed was that of the "best Thessalian strain", and that he died in what is now Punjab, Pakistan, after the Battle of the Hydaspes in 326 BC. The horse was reportedly buried at Jalalpur Sharif, a small town situated a short distance to the southwest of Jhelum. Another account states that Bucephalus is buried in Phalia, a town located near the city of Mandi Bahauddin, which was named after him (Alexandria Bucephalous).

Bucephalus was named after a branding mark depicting an ox's head on his haunch.

Taming of Bucephalus 

A massive creature with a massive head, Bucephalus is described as having a black coat with a large white star on his brow.  He is also supposed to have had a "wall eye" (blue eye) , and his breeding was that of the "best Thessalian strain".

Plutarch says in 344 BC, at twelve or thirteen years of age, Alexander of Macedonia won the horse by making a wager with his father:<ref name="Clough">Arthur Hugh Clough (editor), John Dryden (translator), Plutarch's 'Lives''', vol. II, Modern Library, 2001. </ref>  A horse dealer named Philonicus the Thessalian offered Bucephalus to King Philip II for the remarkably high sum of 13 talents. Because no one could tame the animal, Philip was not interested. However, Alexander was, and he offered to pay himself should he fail.

Alexander was given a chance and surprised all by subduing it.  He spoke soothingly to the horse and turned it toward the sun so that it could no longer see its own shadow, which had been the cause of its distress. Dropping his fluttering cloak as well, Alexander successfully tamed the horse. Plutarch says that the incident so impressed Philip that he told the boy, "O my son, look thee out a kingdom equal to and worthy of thyself, for Macedonia is too little for thee."  Philip's speech strikes the only false note in the anecdote, according to A. R. Anderson, who noted his words as the embryo of the legend fully developed in the History of Alexander the Great I.15, 17.

The Alexander Romance presents a mythic variant of Bucephalus's origin. In this tale, the colt, whose heroic attributes surpassed even those of Pegasus, is bred and presented to Philip on his own estates.  The mythic attributes of the animal are further reinforced in the romance by the Delphic Oracle who tells Philip that the destined king of the world will be the one who rides Bucephalus, a horse with the mark of the ox's head on his haunch.

 Alexander and Bucephalus 

As one of his chargers, Bucephalus served Alexander in numerous battles.

The value which Alexander placed on Bucephalus emulated his hero and supposed ancestor Achilles, who claimed that his horses were  "known to excel all others—for they are immortal. Poseidon gave them to my father Peleus, who in his turn gave them to me."

Arrian states, with Onesicritus as his source, that Bucephalus died at the age of thirty.  Other sources, however, give as the cause of death not old age or weariness, but fatal injuries at the Battle of the Hydaspes (June 326 BC), in which Alexander's army defeated King Porus.  Alexander promptly founded a city, Bucephala, in honour of his horse.  It lay on the west bank of the Hydaspes river (modern-day Jhelum in Pakistan).  The modern-day town of Jalalpur Sharif, outside Jhelum, is said to be where Bucephalus is buried.

The legend of Bucephalus grew in association with that of Alexander, beginning with the fiction that they were born simultaneously: some of the later versions of the Alexander Romance also synchronized the hour of their death.  The pair forged a sort of cult in that, after them, it was all but expected of a conqueror that he have a favourite horse. Julius Caesar had one; so too did the eccentric Roman Emperor Caligula, who made a great fuss of his horse Incitatus, holding birthday parties for him, riding him while adorned with Alexander's breastplate, and planning to make him a consul.

 In art and literature 

 The ancient statue group The Horse Tamers in the Piazza del Quirinale in Rome is often misinterpreted as "Alexander and Bucephalus". An interpretation of their subject as Alexander and Bucephalus was proposed in 1558 by Onofrio Panvinio, who suggested that Constantine had removed them from Alexandria, where they would have referred to the familiar legend of the city's founder. This became a popular alternative to their identification as the Dioscuri.  The popular guides still referred to their creation by Phidias and Praxiteles competing for fame, long after even the modestly learned realized that the two sculptors preceded Alexander by a century.
 Charles Le Brun's (1619–1690) paintings of Alexandrine subjects, including Bucephalus, survive today in the Louvre.  One in particular, The Passage of the Granicus, depicts the warhorse battling the difficulties of the steep muddy river banks, biting and kicking his foes.
 Franz Kafka's short story Der neue Advokat (in his collection  Ein Landarzt, 1919) features Bucephalus transformed.
 The 1979 film The Black Stallion had the protagonist learning the story of Bucephalus from his father, which is put into practice at a later point in the film.
 In the animated series Reign: The Conqueror, a sci-fi inspired rendition of the myth, Bucephalus is a tall man-eating horse with a metallic jaw, prowling in Macedonia and killing everyone unfortunate enough to meet him. Alexander tames him, and as in the myth he becomes his faithful steed.
 In the BBC television series Father Brown, the bicycle that the character Father Brown rides in pursuits of solving mysteries is called Bucephalus.
 In ITV's Inspector Morse prequel drama series, Endeavour, Series 6 Episode 3, Confection, the horse is also named Bucephalus.
 In the 1996 point-and-click adventure video game Broken Sword: The Shadow of the Templars'', a character refers to a racehorse he is reading about in a newspaper as "Bucephalus reborn."

See also 
 List of historical horses
 List of fictional horses
 Bucephalus (brand), an ox-head branding mark anciently used on horses
 Bucephalus (racehorse), an 18th-century Thoroughbred racehorse
 Bucephalus (trematode), a trematode flatworm genus
 BTR-4 "Bucephalus", Ukrainian armored troop carrier

Notes

References

External links 
 

Ancient individual animals
Alexander the Great
Alexander the Great in legend
Ancient Greece
History of Pakistan
Individual warhorses
Individual male horses